Punwar may refer to:

Parmar, an alternate name for the Rajput clan
The Paramara dynasty of the Parmar clan
Punwar, Solapur district, a village in Maharashtra